The Golden Bull of 1356 was a decree issued by the Imperial Diet at Nuremberg and Metz (Diet of Metz, 1356/57) headed by the  Emperor Charles IV which fixed, for a period of more than four hundred years, important aspects of the constitutional structure of the Holy Roman Empire. It was named the Golden Bull for the golden seal it carried.

In June 2013 the Golden Bull was included in the UNESCO's Memory of the World Register.

Background
According to the written text of the Golden Bull of 1356:

Though the election of the King of the Romans by the chief ecclesiastical and secular princes of the Holy Roman Empire was well established, disagreements about the process and papal involvement had repeatedly resulted in controversies, most recently in 1314 when Louis of Bavaria and Frederick of Austria had been elected by opposing sets of electors. Louis, who had eventually subdued his rival's claim on the battlefield, made a first attempt to clarify the process in the Declaration of Rhense of 1338, which renounced any papal involvement and had restricted the right to choose a new king to the prince-electors. The Golden Bull, promulgated by Louis's successor and rival, Charles IV, was more precise in several ways.

Prince-electors

Firstly, the Bull explicitly named the seven Prince-electors (Kurfürsten) who were to choose the King and also defined the Reichserzämter, their (largely ceremonial) offices at court:

Secondly, the principle of majority voting was explicitly stated for the first time in the Empire. The Bull prescribed that four (out of seven) votes would always suffice to elect a new King; as a result, three Electors could no longer block the election. Thirdly, the Electoral principalities were declared indivisible, and succession to them was regulated to ensure that the votes would never be divided. Finally, the Bull cemented a number of privileges for the Electors, confirming their elevated role in the Empire. It is therefore also a milestone in the establishment of largely independent states in the Empire, a process to be concluded only centuries later, notably with the Peace of Westphalia of 1648.

This codification of prince-electors, though largely based on precedence, was not uncontroversial, especially in regard to the two chief rivals of the ruling House of Luxembourg:
The House of Wittelsbach ruled the Duchy of Bavaria as well as the County Palatinate. Dynastic divisions had caused the two territories to devolve upon distinct branches of the house. The Treaty of Pavia, which in 1329 restored the Palatinate branch, stipulated that Bavaria and the Palatinate would alternate in future elections, but the Golden Bull fixed the electoral vote upon the Palatinate and not upon Bavaria, partly because Charles's predecessor and rival Louis IV was of that branch. Louis IV's sons, Louis V and Stephen II of Bavaria, protested this omission, feeling that Bavaria, one of the original duchies of the realm and their family's chief territory for over 170 years, deserved primacy over the Palatinate. The omission of Bavaria from the list of prince-electors also allowed Bavaria, which had only recently been reunited, to fall into dynastic fragmentation again. Brandenburg was in the hands of the Bavarian Wittelsbachs (though held by a junior member of the house) in 1356; they eventually lost the territory to the Luxemburgs in 1373, leaving the Bavarian branch without representation in the electoral college until 1623.
The House of Habsburg, long-time rivals of the Luxembourgs, were completely omitted from the list of prince-electors, leading to decreased political influence and dynastic fragmentation. In retaliation, Duke Rudolf IV, one of the dukes of fragmented Austria, had the Privilegium Maius forged, a document supposedly issued by Emperor Frederick Barbarossa. The document gave Austria – elevated to the position of an Archduchy – special privileges, including primogeniture. While ignored by the Emperor and other princes at the time, the document was eventually ratified when Frederick of Austria himself became Emperor in the 15th century. Still, the Habsburgs remained without an electoral vote until they succeeded to the Kingdom of Bohemia in 1526.

Procedures

The bull regulated the whole election process in great detail, listing explicitly where, when, and under which circumstances what should be done by whom, not only for the prince-electors but also (for example) for the population of Frankfurt, where the elections were to be held, and also for the counts of the regions the prince-electors had to travel through to get there. The decision to hold the elections in Frankfurt reflected a traditional feeling dating from East Frankish days that both election and coronation ought to take place on Frankish soil. However, the election location was not the only specified location; the bull specified that the coronation would take place in Aachen, and Nuremberg would be the place where the first diet of a reign should be held. The elections were to be concluded within thirty days; failing that, the bull prescribed that the prince-electors were to receive only bread and water until they had decided:

Besides regulating the election process, the chapters of the Golden Bull contained many minor decrees. For instance, it also defined the order of marching when the emperor was present, both with and without his insignia. Most  were subsequently dissolved, sometimes forcibly, and where refounded, their political influence was much reduced. Thus the Golden Bull also strengthened the nobility in general to the detriment of the cities.

The pope's involvement with the Golden Bull of 1356 was basically nonexistent, which was significant in the history of relations between the popes and the emperors. When Charles IV laid down procedure for electing a King of the Romans, he mentioned nothing about receiving papal confirmation of the election. However, Pope Innocent VI did not protest this because he needed Charles’s support against the Visconti. Pope Innocent continued to have good relations with Charles IV after the Golden Bull of 1356 until the former's death in 1362.

References

Further reading

External links
 The complete Golden Bull of 1356, translated into English.
 Selections from the Golden Bull from the Internet Mediaeval Sourcebook at the Fordham University Centre for Mediaeval Studies.
 The integral Golden Bull in Latin, comparative listing of all five initial copies.
 Bernd-Ulrich Hergemöller, Golden Bull, 1356, published 8 March 2010, english version published 27 February 2020 ; in: Historisches Lexikon Bayerns
 online-Versions as in Latin as in Medieval High-German Dialects

Literature
 Bryce, James, The Holy Roman Empire (London: The Macmillan Company, A New Edition, 1978), 243. 
 Chambers. D.S., Popes, Cardinals and War (London: I.B. Tauris, 2006), 28. 
 Renouard, Yves, The Avignon Papacy 1305–1403 (Connecticut : Archon Books, 1970), 127. 
 Heer, Friedrich, trans. Janet Sondheimer, The Holy Roman Empire (New York: Federick A. Praeger Publishers, 1968), 117. 

Golden Bulls
History of Frankfurt
1350s in law
Political charters
Charles IV, Holy Roman Emperor
Manuscripts of the Austrian National Library
1350s in the Holy Roman Empire
1356 in Europe
Imperial election (Holy Roman Empire)